Fire Time is a science fiction novel by Poul Anderson, first published in 1974. It was nominated for the Hugo Award for Best Novel in 1975.

Plot introduction
Fire Time takes place on the planet Ishtar in the "Anubelea" system, located 300 parsecs away from the Sun. Ishtar's peculiar orbit around the three stars of the Anubelea system (Bel, Ea, and Anu) results in the "Fire Time", a dramatic increase in heat every thousand years as the "demon star" Anu approaches the planet. As the northern hemisphere heats up, large numbers of Ishtarians flee south, leading to a collapse of civilization. The northern natives (Valennen) take advantage of the Gathering's (southern natives) culture to win two victories in Valennen territory.  The presence of visitors from Earth (also engaged in their own war off-planet at Nasqua) raises the prospect of changing the dynamics of history, though, with Earth involved in an interstellar war of its own, human aid is not guaranteed.

Themes and continuity
The presence of Gunnar Heim sets this story in the same universe as Anderson's earlier The Star Fox and while both of these books revolve around the theme of conflict, the core themes of Fire Time are more closely related to the Israeli–Palestinian conflict than to the Vietnam War allegory of The Star Fox. Several scenes in particular evoke this connection, particularly the sequence of the historical character Sigurdsson declaring the independence of the republic of Eleutheria in a manner not dissimilar to David Ben-Gurion's declaration of the independence of Israel. Anderson took a more nuanced view to Middle-eastern conflict than he did with America's struggle against communism, a theme also developed in There Will Be Time and some of the stories of his "Time Patrol" sequence. To this end, the focus is more political than military. In particular, Gunnar Heim's reappearance is in a much less mercenary capacity, endorsing peaceful co-existence between the warring humans and aliens.

See also
 HD 181068
 HD 188753

References

External links 
 
 Ishtar
Fire Time at Worlds Without End

1974 American novels
American science fiction novels
Novels by Poul Anderson
Doubleday (publisher) books